John Wiley Edmands (March 1, 1809 – January 31, 1877) was a member of the United States House of Representatives from Massachusetts.

Edmands was born in Boston on March 1, 1809. He completed preparatory studies, and graduated from English High School of Boston.  He became interested in woolen mills in Dedham and the Pacific Mills Company in Lawrence.

Edmands was elected as a Whig to the Thirty-third Congress (March 4, 1853 – March 3, 1855).  He declined to be a candidate for renomination in 1854, and returned to Pacific Mills and served as its treasurer.  Edmands was a presidential elector on the Republican ticket in 1868.

He died in Newton on January 31, 1877. His interment was in Mount Auburn Cemetery in Cambridge.

External links
 

1809 births
1877 deaths
Politicians from Boston
Massachusetts Republicans
Burials at Mount Auburn Cemetery
Whig Party members of the United States House of Representatives from Massachusetts
19th-century American politicians
19th-century American businesspeople